The 1966 All-Ireland Minor Hurling Championship was the 36th staging of the All-Ireland Minor Hurling Championship since its establishment by the Gaelic Athletic Association in 1928.

Dublin entered the championship as the defending champions, however, they were beaten in the Leinster semi-final.

On 16 October 1966 Wexford won the championship following a 4-1 to 1-8 defeat of Cork in a replay of the All-Ireland final. This was their second All-Ireland title and their first in three championship seasons.

Results

Leinster Minor Hurling Championship

Preliminary round

First round

Quarter-finals

Semi-finals

Final

Munster Minor Hurling Championship

Quarter-finals

Semi-finals

Final

Ulster Minor Hurling Championship

Semi-finals

Final

All-Ireland Minor Hurling Championship

Semi-finals

Finals

External links
 All-Ireland Minor Hurling Championship: Roll Of Honour

Minor
All-Ireland Minor Hurling Championship